Joseph Yamil "Jackie" Marrero García (born April 9, 1993) is a Puerto Rican footballer who plays for Academia Quintana San Juan as a midfielder.

Career
Marrero has played professional football for Conquistadores de Guaynabo, Puerto Rico Islanders, Academia Quintana and Kultsu.

He made his senior international debut for Puerto Rico in 2011, and has appeared in FIFA World Cup qualifying matches.

International goals

References

1993 births
Living people
Sportspeople from San Juan, Puerto Rico
Puerto Rican footballers
Puerto Rico international footballers
Association football midfielders
Puerto Rico Islanders players
Academia Quintana players
Kultsu FC players
North American Soccer League players
Kakkonen players
Puerto Rican expatriate footballers
Puerto Rican expatriate sportspeople in Finland
Expatriate footballers in Finland
Puerto Rico FC players